Upfront Ventures, formerly known as GRP Partners, is a Santa Monica-based venture capital firm that invests in early-stage technology companies. It is one of the largest venture capital firms in Los Angeles, with $2 billion in total raised funds. Since its founding in 1996, Upfront Ventures has invested in more than 200 companies, with notable exits including Ulta, Overture, PayPal Credit, TrueCar, Disney Digital Network, Kyriba, and  Ring.

History
Upfront Ventures was formed in 1996 in Century City, Los Angeles under the name GRP Partners, founded by Yves Sisteron, Steven Dietz and Steve Lebow.

GRP Partners was best known for investing in chain restaurants like P. F. Chang's and Starbucks, as well as retailers like Costco and Ulta, but it also invested in tech companies such as PayPal Credit, Overture, and Disney Digital Network.  Mark Suster joined GRP Partners in 2007 as general manager, and became a managing partner in 2011.

In 2013, the company renamed itself to Upfront Ventures, a rebranding intended to reflect transparency and openness with startups in their early stages, and in reference to the entertainment industry's upfronts. The company also moved to Santa Monica, California, placing it in closer proximity to Los Angeles' tech and startup center, Silicon Beach, although the company makes investments in companies all over the world.

In 2015, the company named rap artist Chamillionaire as its "entrepreneur-in-residence", where he developed the Convoz app.

In July 2017, Upfront created a $400 million fund, specifically established for investing in startups over the next several years.

Upfront Ventures also hosts the Upfront Summit tech conference, held in Los Angeles.

In 2020, Upfront engaged in the payroll space by leading seed round funding for Clair.

Investments
The firm’s notable investments include:
 Apeel Sciences
 Deliv
 Qordoba
 Qualys
  thredUP
 UGO Networks

Notes

References

External links
 Official website

Venture capital firms of the United States
Companies based in Santa Monica, California
Financial services companies established in 1996